The Durance class is a series of multi-product replenishment oilers, originally designed and built for service in the French Navy. Besides the five ships built for the French Navy, a sixth was built for the Royal Australian Navy, while the lead ship of the class currently serves with the Argentine Navy. Two ships of a similar but smaller design are in service with the Royal Saudi Navy as the s.

In French Navy service the ships were used with the Force d'action navale (FAN, "Naval Action Force"). The last three French ships were built to a modified design with increased space for command operations. The three ships are used as flagships for French naval forces in the Indian Ocean. In 2009, Somme repelled an attack by pirates off the coast of Somalia. In 2014, a second French ship was removed from service followed by a third in 2021. In 2019, the Australian ship was taken out of service.

French Navy

Design and description
In French service, the class the first two ships were dubbed Pétrolier Ravitailleur d'Escadre (PRE, "fleet replenishment oiler"), and the final three, Bâtiment de commandement et ravitailleur (BCR, "command and replenishment ship"). In addition to their role as a fleet tanker, the three dubbed BCR can accommodate an entire general staff and thus supervise naval operations. The first two ships carry two cranes abaft the bridge, while the final three only have one positioned along the centreline.

The five ships are of similar design but different layouts.

Durance was initially equipped with two landing craft for vehicles and personnel. Each ship has two dual solid/liquid underway transfer stations per side and can replenish two ships per side and one astern. These numbers changed with the needs of the fleet.

The Durance-class tankers all mount a flight deck over the stern and a hangar. The ships utilised Aérospatiale Alouette III and Westland Lynx helicopters (prior to the retirement of both types) but are capable of operating larger ones from their flight deck. For defence, Durance was armed with twin-mounted Bofors /L60 anti-aircraft (AA) guns. The other four ships initially mounted one Bofors 40 mm/L60 AA guns and two  AA guns in a twin turret. They are equipped with two DRBN 34 navigational radars. The armament was later altered for the final four ships by removing the 20 mm guns and adding four  M2 Browning machine guns and three launchers for Simbad Mistral surface-to-air missiles. Meuse had only one launcher installed. The ships have a complement of 162 and are capable of accommodating 250 personnel.

Ships in class

Five ships of the class were built for the French Navy:

Three ships of the class (Marne, Somme, and Var) were fitted out as flagships able to embark an admiral and his staff. The 2013 French White Paper on Defence and National Security planned to replace them with four new double-hulled tankers between 2018 and 2021. However, Meuse was decommissioned in December 2015 under budget cuts announced a year earlier and Var followed in 2021. They will be replaced under the FLOTLOG project by four derivatives of Italy's Vulcano Logistic Support Ship, scheduled to be delivered in 2023, 2025, 2027 and (subject to ratification of the next procurement plan) 2029.

Construction and career
The first four tankers were constructed by the Arsenal de Brest at Brest, France between 1973 and 1987. The fifth and final ship was ordered in March 1984 as part of the 1984–1988 plan and was built by Normed at their yard La Seyne, France. The Durance-class ships began entering service in 1976 were assigned to the Force d'action navale (FAR, "Naval Action Force"). One of the BCRs (Var, Marne and Somme) is assigned to Indian Ocean as flagship of the French naval forces in the region. In October 2009, Somme repelled an attack by Somali pirates.

Royal Australian Navy

The Royal Australian Navy (RAN) ordered one vessel, HMAS Success, of a modified design in September 1979. A second vessel was planned in 1980, but not optioned. Construction of Success was slow and costs increased. Propulsion machinery consisted of two SEMT-Pielstick 16 PC2.5 V 400 diesel motors, which supplied  to the ship's two propeller shafts. Success had a total capacity of 10,200 tonnes of cargo: 8,707 tonnes of diesel fuel, 975 tonnes of aviation fuel, 250 tonnes of munitions (including guided missiles and torpedoes), 116 tonnes of water, 95 tonnes of components and naval stores, and 57 tonnes of food and other consumables. Fuel and liquid stores could be transferred from four points (two on each side), allowing Success to replenish two ships simultaneously, while solid cargo could be moved via vertical replenishment (with a hangar and helipad for a single Sea King, Seahawk, or Squirrel helicopter), or by boat (the RAN LCVP T 7 was carried on a starboard forward davit). The ship was armed with seven 12.7 mm machine guns, and was fitted for but not with a Mark 15 Phalanx CIWS. The sensor suite includes two Kelvin Hughes Type 100G navigation radars. Ship's company was made up of 25 officers and 212 sailors.

Ships in class

Argentine Navy

On 12 July 1999, Argentina acquired Durance from the French Navy (originally commissioned into French service in 1976) and renamed the ship ARA Patagonia. The ship mounts only two Bofors 40 mm/60 guns and four 12.7 mm machine guns. The ship uses an Alouette III helicopter. The ship entered Argentine Navy service in July 2000. The ship was reported non-operational in 2020. In October 2022, it was reported that the Argentine defence ministry had allocated funding for a refit of the ship to be carried out at the Puerto Belgrano Naval Arsenal in collaboration with the Tandanor shipyard. The ship was reported to have entered dry dock in early 2023.

Ships in class

Royal Saudi Navy

In October 1980, Saudi Arabia signed a contract for two replenishment oilers as part of the Sawari I programme. They use two  SEMT Pielstick 14 PC2.5 V 500 diesel engines driving two shafts. They have a complement of 140. The ship is armed by four Breda Bofors 40 mm/70 guns in two twin mounts. They have two CSEE Naja optronic fire control directors for the 40 mm guns. They have an aft helicopter deck, and can carry either two Eurocopter AS365 Dauphin or one Eurocopter AS332 Super Puma helicopters. Both ships underwent upgrades in 1996–1998. They serve as training ships and depot and maintenance ships.

Notes

Citations

References

 
 
 
 

Auxiliary replenishment ship classes
Active auxiliary ships of France
 
Ship classes of the French Navy